The 2000 Dubai Sevens was an international rugby sevens tournament that was the second leg of the 2000–01 World Sevens Series. The Dubai Sevens took place at the Dubai Exiles Rugby Ground on 23–24 November 2000.

The hosts, Arabian Gulf, were defeated 43–17 by Ireland in the Bowl quarterfinals whilst defending World Sevens Series champions New Zealand won their third straight Sevens title by defeating Fiji 38–12 in the Cup final.

Format
The teams were drawn into four pools of four teams each. Each team played the other teams in their pool once, with 3 points awarded for a win, 2 points for a draw, and 1 point for a loss (no points awarded for a forfeit). The pool stage was played on the first day of the tournament. The top two teams from each pool advanced to the Cup/Plate brackets. The bottom two teams from each pool went on to the Bowl bracket. No Shield trophy was on offer in the 2000-01 season.

Teams
The 16 participating teams for the tournament:

  Arabian Gulf

Pool stage

Pool A

Source: World Rugby

Source: World Rugby

Pool B

Source: World Rugby

Source: World Rugby

Pool C

Source: World Rugby

Source: World Rugby

Pool D

Source: World Rugby

Source: World Rugby

Knockout stage

Bowl

Source: World Rugby

Plate

Source: World Rugby

Cup

Source: World Rugby

Tournament placings

Source: Rugby7.com

Series standings
At the completion of Round 2:

Source: Rugby7.com

References

2000–01
2000–01 IRB Sevens World Series
2000 in Emirati sport
2000 in Asian rugby union